Sachsenheim is a town in the district of Ludwigsburg, Baden-Württemberg, Germany. It is situated 11 km northwest of Ludwigsburg.

Buildings
 The most important attraction is the water castle in Großsachsenheim. Built in the 14th century, burned down in 1542 and rebuilt in 1544. 1952 the castle was purchased by the city Großsachsenheim and is since 1962 the town hall.

 Evangelische Stadtkirche "St. Fabian and Sebastian "in Großsachsenheim, former fortified church
 Remains of the old city wall with tower
 Evangelische Stadtkirche Kleinsachsenheim, former fortified church, rebuilt in 1460 and 1619, reconstruction 1948-1950
 Town hall Kleinsachsenheim, half-timbered building, first mentioned in 1614
 Parish Church "St. George "Hohenhaslach from 1230. Valuable early Gothic frescos 

 Village road Ochsenbach, half-timbered houses from the 16th to 18th centuries

 Protestant parish "Our Lady" Ochsenbach, built around 1290, Gothic frescoes of 1430
 Evangelical church "St. Remigius "Häfnerhaslach, Gothic choir with ribbed vaults, frescoes (around 1400)
 North of Ochsenbach is the telecommunication tower Cleebronn

Regular events
 Heimatfest in five-year intervals
 Krämer market in Hohenhaslach (always on 1 May)
 Summer at the castle (on the 3rd weekend in July)
 Sachsenheimer Summer Special (on the 3rd weekend of September)
 Christmas market in the exterior courtyard (always on 2nd Advent)

Economy and Infrastructure

Viticulture
The neighborhoods in Kirbachtal and Kleinsachsenheim has a long wine growing  history. Approximately 250 hectares of the district area of the city consists of vineyards.

Transportation

Sachsenheim is located approximately 30 kilometers from the state capital Stuttgart.
 Car: Bundesautobahn 81 exit Ludwigsburg-Nord, continues on B 27 and L 1125 to Großsachsenheim
 Railway: Sachsenheim is connected to the rail network by the in Großsachsenheim located station Sachsenheim to the Württemberg Western Railway (Bietigheim-Bissingen-Bruchsal); the station serves the regional express-line Stuttgart-Bietigheim-Bissingen-Mühlacker-Heidelberg, the Regional Express-line Stuttgart-Bietigheim-Bissingen-Mühlacker-Pforzheim-Karlsruhe and the tram -lines S5 / S6 (Bietigheim-Bissingen-Mühlacker-Pforzheim-Karlsruhe-Wörth or Bietigheim-Bissingen-Mühlacker-Pforzheim-Wildbad)

Sons and daughters of the town 

 Hermann von Sachsenheim (1365-1458), poet
 Eberhard David Hauber (1695-1765), born in Hohenhaslach, theologian
 Ferdinand Schnaidt (1840-1910), born in Hohenhaslach, bank manager, member of Reichstag and Landtag
 Thomas Knodel (born 1953), church musician

Other 
The city Sachsenheim became known nationwide when it became public that the RAF-terrorists Christian Klar, Knut Folkerts and Günter Sonnenberg had set up several weeks in the residential and commercial complex opposite the train station. After the attack on Siegfried Buback the police  found here  the getaway car – a silver-gray Alfa Romeo Giulia.

See also

References

Ludwigsburg (district)
Württemberg